CCR4-NOT transcription complex subunit 8 is a protein that in humans is encoded by the CNOT8 gene. It is a subunit of the CCR4-Not deadenylase complex.

Interactions 

CNOT8 has been shown to interact with BTG2, BTG1, CNOT1 and CNOT3.

References

Further reading

External links